The year 1920 in film involved some significant events.


Top-grossing films (U.S.)
The top three films released in 1920 by U.S. gross are as follows:

Events
 March 28 – "America's Sweetheart" Mary Pickford and "Everybody's Hero" Douglas Fairbanks marry, becoming the first supercouple of Hollywood.
 August – Jack Cohn, Joe Brandt and Harry Cohn form C. B. C. Film Sales Corporation which would later become Columbia Pictures.
 August 15 – Robert J. Flaherty arrives in northern Canada to begin filming Nanook of the North (1922).
 November 27 – The Mark of Zorro, starring Douglas Fairbanks, opens.

Notable films released in 1920

Austria
For a complete list see: List of Austrian films of the 1920s
 Anita (aka Trance), directed by Luise Kolm and Jakob Fleck; an obscure adaptation of George Du Maurier's novel Trilby
Boccaccio, directed by Michael Curtiz.
The Prince and the Pauper directed by Alexander Korda.
The Scourge of God directed by Michael Curtiz.
The Star of Damascus directed by Michael Curtiz.

France
For a complete list see: French films of 1920
Barrabas,  a 12-chapter serial/ crime drama directed by Louis Feuillade
The Man Who Sold His Soul to the Devil, directed by Pierre Caron 
Les Morts qui parlent/ The Dead Who Speak, directed by Pierre Marodon
Narayana (translates as Vishnu), directed by Leon Poirier, starring Laurence Myrga and Edmon Van Daele; based on the 1831 novel "Le Peau de Chagrin" by Honore de Balzac, with some story elements lifted from Wilkie Collins' novel The Moonstone
The Silence, ghost film directed by Louis Delluc, starring Gabriel Signoret and Eve Francis (Delluc's wife)

Germany
For a complete list see: List of German films of 1920
Algol: Tragedy of Power, science fiction film directed by Hans Werckmeister, starring Emil Jannings
Anna Boleyn directed by Ernst Lubitsch
The Cabinet of Dr. Caligari directed by Robert Wiene; starring Werner Krauss, Conrad Veidt and Lil Dagover
 Cagliostro, directed by Reinhold Schuenzel, starred Schuenzel and Conrad Veidt (a lost film)
The Devil Worshippers/ Die Teufelsanbeter, A 6-part serial directed by Marie Louise Droop, starring Carl de Vogt and Bela Lugosi, based on the novel by Carl May
Evening – Night – Morning (Abend – Nacht – Morgen) directed by F. W. Murnau 
Genuine: A Tale of a Vampire, directed by Robert Wiene, starring Fern Andra; only a 43-minute condensation of the much longer original film exists
The Golem: How He Came into the World (Der Golem, Wie Er in die Welt Kam), directed by and starring Paul Wegener based on the old Jewish folktale, photographed by Karl Freund 
The Head of Janus (Der Januskopf), directed by F. W. Murnau, starring Conrad Veidt and Bela Lugosi, photographed by Karl Freund; based (without authorization) on the Robert Louis Stevenson novel Dr. Jekyll and Mr. Hyde
 Hound of the Baskervilles, directed by Willy Zehn, released in two parts (Dr. MacDonald's Sanitorium and The House Without Windows); Willy Keyser-Heyl played Sherlock Holmes
The House Without Windows, directed by Friedrich Feher, not to be confused with the above Hound of the Baskervilles
The Hunchback and the Dancer (Der Bucklige und die Tänzerin), directed by F. W. Murnau , photographed by Karl Freund
Kohlhiesels Töchter (Kohlhiesel's Daughter) directed by Ernst Lubitsch 
Kurfurstendamm, a horror-comedy written and directed by Richard Oswald, starring Conrad Veidt as The Devil, photographed by Carl Hoffmann
The Last of the Mohicans (Der Letzte der Mohikaner), starring Bela Lugosi 
 Nachtgestalten (aka Eleagable Kuperus), directed by Richard Oswald, starring Conrad Veidt and Paul Wegener, photographed by Carl Hoffmann, based on the Karl Hans Strobl short story Eleagable Kuperus
Satan (Satanas) directed by F. W. Murnau, starred Conrad Veidt, filmed in 1919
Sumurun (One Arabian Night) directed by Ernst Lubitsch, starring Paul Wegener and Pola Negri
Die Todeskarawane, starring Dora Gerson and Bela Lugosi
 Torgus, the Coffin Maker, directed by Hans Kobe

Hungary
Lord Arthur Saville's Crime (aka The Mark of the Phantom), written and directed by Paul Fejos, starring Margit Lux, based on the 1891 story by Oscar Wilde

Italy
The Last of the Borgias, directed by Armando Carbone
The Power of the Borgias, directed by Luigi Caramba for Medusa Film, starring Irene Saffo-Nomo and Enrico Piacentini
 Spiritism (aka Spiritismo), starring Francesca Bettina

Japan
Akakabe Myojin/ The Red Wall God, a ghost-cat film directed by Jiro Yoshino for Kokkatsu Films, starring Shirogoro Sawamura
Arima no neko/ The Cat in Arima, a ghost-cat film directed by Shozo Makino for Nikkatsu Films, starring Matsumosuke Onoe and Sentaro Nakamura

Philippines
For a complete list see: List of Philippine films before 1940
La Mariposa Negra directed by Jose Nepomuceno

Sweden
For a complete list see: Swedish films before 1930
Erotikon directed by Mauritz Stiller 
Herr och fru Stockholm (How Not to Dress), starring Greta Garbo 
Karin Daughter of Ingmar (Karin Ingmarsdotter) directed by & starring Victor Sjöström 
The Monastery of Sendomir (Klostret i Sendomir) directed by Victor Sjöström 
The Parson's Widow (Prästänkan) directed by Carl Theodor Dreyer

United Kingdom
For a complete list see: British films of 1920
At the Villa Rose, directed by Maurice Elvey, based on the 1910 novel by A.E.W. Mason
 The Barton Mystery, directed by Harry (Henry) Roberts, starred Lyn Harding;  based on the 1917 stage play by Walter Hackett
Bleak House directed by Maurice Elvey
Build Thy House directed by Fred Goodwins, starring Henry Ainley
Colonel Newcome directed by Fred Goodwins' starring Milton Rosmer, Joyce Carey
Desire (aka The Magic Skin) directed by George Edwardes-Hall, starring Dennis Neilson-Terry, based on the 1831 novel Le Peau de Chagrin by Honore de Balzac
Ernest Maltravers directed by Jack Denton; starring Lillian Hall-Davis
The Ever Open Door directed by Fred Goodwins; starring Hayford Hobbs 
The Face at the Window, directed by Wilfred Noy, starring C. Aubrey Smith and Gladys Jennings, based on the stage play by F. Brooke Warren
 The Fordington Twins directed by W.P. Kellino 
General Post directed by Thomas Bentley; starring Douglas Munro, Lilian Braithwaite 
The Great London Mystery, a 12-chapter serial directed by Charles Raymond for T&P Films, starring David Devant and Lady Doris Stapleton; features a Yellow Peril menace called Ching Ling Fu. 
The Lure of Crooning Water directed by Arthur Rooke; starring Guy Newall and Ivy Duke 
Mr. Gilfil's Love Story directed by A.V. Bramble; starring Mary Odette 
The Price of Silence (aka At the Mercy of Tiberius), directed by Fred Leroy Granville, starring Peggy Hyland and Campbell Gullan 
A Son of David directed by Hay Plumb; starring Ronald Colman 
Trent's Last Case directed by Richard Garrick; starring Gregory Scott, Pauline Peters and Clive Brook 
The Twelve Pound Look directed by Jack Denton; starring Milton Rosmer
The Yellow Claw, directed by Rene Plaisetty, starring Arthur Cullin and Cyril Percival;  based on the 1915 novel by Sax Rohmer featuring a criminal Asian menace named Mr. King.

United States
For a complete list see: American films of 1920

A
Along the Moonbeam Trail, contained animated dinosaur sequences by Willis O'Brien
April Folly, directed by Robert Z. Leonard, starring Marion Davies and Conway Tearle

B
 Black Shadows, directed by Howard M. Mitchell

C
The Copperhead, directed by Charles Maigne, starring Lionel Barrymore

D
 The Dark Mirror, directed by Charles Giblyn, starring Dorothy Dalton, based on the story by Louis Joseph Vance
The Devil's Pass Key (lost), directed by Erich von Stroheim, starring Mae Busch
The Devil to Pay, directed by Ernest C. Warde, based on a 1917 novel by Frances Nimmo Greene
Dr. Jekyll and Mr. Hyde, directed by John S. Robertson, starring John Barrymore
Dr. Jekyll and Mr. Hyde, directed by J. Charles Haydon, starring Sheldon Lewis
The Dream Cheater, directed by Ernest C. Warde, starring J. Warren Kerrigan, based on the 1831 novel La Peau de chagrin by Honoré de Balzac

F
 The Flapper, directed by Alan Crosland, starring Olive Thomas

G
The Girl in Number 29 (lost), directed by John Ford, starring Frank Mayo
Go and Get It, directed by Marshall Neilan and Henry Roberts Symonds

H
Haunted Spooks, directed by Alfred J. Goulding and Hal Roach, starring Harold Lloyd
His Brother's Keeper (lost), directed by Wilfred North
The House of the Tolling Bell, directed by J. Stuart Blackton, starring May McAvoy and Bruce Gordon, based on the novel by Edith Sessions Tupper
The House of Whispers (lost), directed by Ernest C. Warde, starring J. Warren Kerrigan, based  on the 1918 novel by William Andrew Johnston
Huckleberry Finn, directed by William Desmond Taylor, starring Lewis Sargent

I
If I Were King, directed by J. Gordon Edwards, starring William Farnum

J
The Jack-Knife Man, directed by King Vidor
Judy of Rogue's Harbor (lost), directed by William Desmond Taylor, starring Mary Miles Minter

L
Lady Rose's Daughter (lost), directed by Hugh Ford, starring Elsie Ferguson
The Last of the Mohicans, directed by Maurice Tourneur and Clarence Brown, starring Wallace Beery and Barbara Bedford
The Love Flower, directed by D. W. Griffith, starring Richard Barthelmess and Carol Dempster
Love Without Question (lost), directed by B. A. Rolfe, starring Olive tell, based on the 1917 novel The Abandoned Room by Charles Wadsworth Camp 
Luring Shadows, directed by Joseph Levering

M
The Mark of Zorro, directed by Fred Niblo, starring Douglas Fairbanks, Marguerite De La Motte and Noah Beery Sr.
The Master Mind, directed by Kenneth Webb, starring Lionel Barrymore
The Mollycoddle, directed by Victor Fleming, starring Douglas Fairbanks and Wallace Beery
The Mystery Mind, a 15-chapter serial directed by William S. Davis and Fred Sittenham

N
Nomads of the North, directed by David Hartford and James Oliver Curwood, starring Lon Chaney, Betty Blythe and Lewis Stone

O
Old Lady 31, directed by John Ince, starring Emma Dunn
One Hour Before Dawn, directed by Henry King, starring H. B. Warner and Anna Q. Nilsson
Outside the Law, directed by Tod Browning, starring Priscilla Dean and Lon Chaney
Over the Hill to the Poorhouse, directed by Harry F. Millarde

P
The Penalty, directed by Wallace Worsley, starring Lon Chaney, based on the pulp novel by Gouverneur Morris
The Phantom Foe, a 15-chapter serial directed by Bertram Millhauser, starring Juanita Hansen and Warner Oland
The Phantom Melody (lost), directed by Douglas Gerrard, starring Monroe Salisbury
Pollyanna, directed by Paul Powell, starring Mary Pickford

R
The Restless Sex, directed by Robert Z. Leonard, starring Marion Davies
Romance (lost), directed by Chester Withey

S
The Screaming Shadow (lost), a 15-chapter serial directed by Ben F. Wilson and Duke Worne
Sex, directed by Fred Niblo, starring Louise Glaum
Shipwrecked Among Cannibals (lost), documentary film directed by William F. Adler
Something to Think About, directed by Cecil B. DeMille, starring Gloria Swanson
Stolen Moments, directed by James Vincent, starring Marguerite Namara and Rudolph Valentino
Suds, directed by John Francis Dillon, starring Mary Pickford

T
Treasure Island (lost), directed by Maurice Tourneur, starring Lon Chaney and Shirley Mason

W
Way Down East, directed by D. W. Griffith, starring Lillian Gish and Richard Barthelmess
Within Our Gates, directed by Oscar Micheaux, starring Evelyn Preer
Why Change Your Wife?, directed by Cecil B. DeMille, starring Gloria Swanson, Thomas Meighan and Bebe Daniels

Film serials
The Son of Tarzan, a 15-chapter film series

Short film series
Harold Lloyd (1913–1951)
An Eastern Westerner
Get Out and Get Under
Haunted Spooks
High and Dizzy
His Royal Slyness
Number, Please?
Buster Keaton (1917–1941)
The Garage
One Week
The Saphead
Convict 13
The Scarecrow
Neighbors

Animated short film series
The following is a list of animated shorts of the year 1920 that belong to series that lasted several years.
Felix the Cat (1919–1936)
A Frolic with Felix (January 25, 1920)
Felix the Big Game Hunter (February 22, 1920)
Wrecking a Romeo (March 7, 1920)
Felix the Food Controller (April 11, 1920)
Felix the Pinch Hitter (April 18, 1920)
Foxy Felix (May 16, 1920)
A Hungry Hoodoo (June 6, 1920)
The Great Cheese Robbery (June 13, 1920)
Felix and the Feed Bag (July 18, 1920)
Nifty Nurse (August 22, 1920)
The Circus (September 26, 1920)
My Hero (October 24, 1920)
Felix the Landlord (November 21, 1920)
Felix's Fish Story (December 26, 1920)
Out of the Inkwell (1918–1929)
A major animated series of the silent era produced by Max Fleischer from 1918 to 1929 in which it appeared Koko the Clown:
The Boxing Kangaroo
The Chinaman
The Circus
The Ouija Board
The Clown's Little Brother
Perpetual Motion
Poker
The Restaurant

Births
January 7 
Vincent Gardenia, actor (died 1992)
Witold Sadowy, Polish actor died 2020)
January 16 - Elliott Reid, American actor (died 2013)
January 19 - Johnny Haymer, American actor (died 1989)
January 20
DeForest Kelley, actor (died 1999)
Federico Fellini, film director (died 1993)
January 24 - Jerry Maren, American actor (died 2018)
January 27 – John Box, production designer, four-time Oscar winner (died 2005)
January 30
Michael Anderson, director (died 2018)
Delbert Mann, director (died 2007)
February 8 – Bengt Ekerot, Swedish actor and director (died 1971)
February 11 – Billy Halop, actor (died 1976)
February 26 – Tony Randall, actor (died 2004)
February 29 – Michèle Morgan, actress (died 2016)
March 3 – James Doohan, actor (died 2005)
March 6 – Lewis Gilbert, director (died 2018)
March 16 – Leo McKern, actor (died 2002)
March 19 – Paul Hagen, Danish actor (died 2003)
March 22
 Werner Klemperer, German actor (died 2000) 
 Ross Martin, Polish-American actor (died 1981)
April 1 
 Toshiro Mifune, actor (died 1997)
 Susanna Ramel, Swedish actress (died 2020)
April 2 – Jack Webb, actor (died 1982)
April 17 - Arnold Yarrow, retired English actor and screenwriter
April 20 – Gianrico Tedeschi, actor (died 2020)
May 2 – Preben Neergaard, Danish actor (died 1990)
May 7 – Rendra Karno, Indonesian actor (died 1985)
May 11 – Denver Pyle, actor (died 1997)
May 16 – Martine Carol, actress (died 1967)
May 20 – Virginia Vale, actress (died 2006)
May 26 
 John Dall, American actor (died 1971)
 Peggy Lee, singer, songwriter, actress (died 2002)
May 29 – Clifton James, actor (died 2017)
June 1 - Alethea McGrath, Australian actress and comedian (died 2016)
June 12 – Jim Siedow, American actor (died 2003)
June 13 – Rex Everhart, American actor (died 2000)
June 15 – Alberto Sordi, Italian actor (died 2003)
June 17 – Setsuko Hara, Japanese film actress (died 2015)
June 18 – Ian Carmichael, English stage, film and television actor (died 2010)
June 29 – Ray Harryhausen, producer, visual effects artist (died 2013)
July 1 – Harold Sakata, American film actor (died 1982)
July 5 - Viola Harris, American actress (died 2017)
July 11 – Yul Brynner, actor (died 1985)
July 12 – Keith Andes, American actor (died 2005)
July 16 – Phillip Pine, American actor (died 2006)
July 28 – Andrew V. McLaglen, film & TV director, son of Victor McLaglen (died 2014)
July 29 – Rodolfo Acosta, actor (died 1974)
July 31 – Franca Valeri, actress (died 2020)
August 6 – Ella Raines, actress (died 1988)
August 8 - Dominique Marcas, French actress (died 2022)
August 13 – Neville Brand, actor (died 1992)
August 17 – Maureen O'Hara, actress (died 2015)
August 18 – Shelley Winters, actress (died 2006)
August 22 – Ray Bradbury, writer (died 2012)
August 30 - Leonid Shvartsman, Russian animator (died 2022)
August 31
James Lanphier, American actor (died 1969)
G. D. Spradlin, American actor (died 2011)
September 1 - Richard Farnsworth, American actor and stuntman (died 2000)
September 9 - Ardeshir Kazemi, Iranian actor
September 18 – Jack Warden, actor (died 2006)
September 23 – Mickey Rooney, actor (died 2014)
September 26 – Barbara Britton, actress (died 1980)
September 27 – William Conrad, actor (died 1994)
October 1 – Walter Matthau, actor (died 2000)
October 9 - Jason Wingreen, American actor (died 2015)
October 10 - Noah Keen, actor (died 2019)
October 13 – Laraine Day, actress (died 2007)
October 15 - Mario Puzo, American author and screenwriter (died 1999)
October 17 – Montgomery Clift, actor (died 1966)
October 18 – Melina Mercouri, actress (died 1994)
October 19 - LaWanda Page, American actress and comedian (died 2002)
October 21
Hy Averback, actor (died 1997)
Ruth Terry, actress, singer (died 2016)
October 22 – Mitzi Green, actress (died 1969)
October 27 – Nanette Fabray, actress (died 2018)
October 29 - Hilda Bernard, Argentine actress (died 2022)
November 10 – Jennifer Holt, actress (died 1997)
November 13 – Jack Elam, actor (died 2003)
November 19 – Gene Tierney, actress (died 1991)
November 21 – Ralph Meeker, actor (died 1988)
November 25 
Shelagh Fraser, English actress (died 2000)
Ricardo Montalbán, actor (died 2009)
Noel Neill, actress (died 2016)
November 30 – Virginia Mayo, actress (died 2005)
December 7 – Frances Gifford, actress (died 1994)
December 29 – Viveca Lindfors, actress (died 1995)
December 30 – Jack Lord, actor (died 1998)
December 31 – Rex Allen, American cowboy actor, singer (died 1999)

Deaths
 January 31 – Gilda Langer, 23, German actress
 February 11 – Gaby Deslys, 38, French actress, dancer, singer
 February 17 – Thomas Commerford, 64, American veteran character actor
 March 2 – Harry Solter, 46, American actor
 April 12 – Walter Edwards, 50, American director
 April 25 – Clarine Seymour, 21, American actress
 May 22 – Hal Reid, 59, American actor & director (father of Wallace Reid)
 June 14 – Gabrielle Réjane, 64, stage and film actress
 August 1 – Eugene Gaudio, 33, Italian born cinematographer (brother of Tony Gaudio)
 August 2 – Ormer Locklear, 29, American stunt flier
 August 13 – Gladys Field, 31, actress (died in childbirth)
 August 28 – Suzanne Grandais, 27, French actress
 September 5 – Robert Harron, 27, American actor
 September 10 – Olive Thomas, 25, American actress
 November 19 – Will S. Davis, 38, American film director
 December 9 – Mollie McConnell, 55, American actress

Film debuts
 Mary Astor
 Madge Bellamy
 Charles Boyer
 Greta Garbo
 Alfred Hitchcock – director
 Barbara La Marr
 Victor McLaglen
 Nita Naldi
 Claude Rains
 Otis Skinner
 Cornelia Otis Skinner

Films set in 1920 
There are films released in later years whose plot is developed totally or partially in 1920:

Manhattan Melodrama (1934)
Winterset (1936)
The Road Back (1937)
Clash of Loyalties (1938)
Three Comrades (1938)
Hostile Whirlwinds (1953): Film portrays the first years of Soviet government, biography of Felix Dzerzhinsky in 1918–1921.
Kappalottiya Thamizhan (1961)
The Ball of Count Orgel (1970): Set in 1920, the Comte hosts a soirée and dance for the upper echelons of Parisian society.
Vengeance (1970): The film is set in 1920 Peking, and centers on a revenge plight of Chiang.
Reds (1981)
Once Upon a Time in America (1984): David "Noodles" Aaronson struggles as a street kid in Manhattan's Lower East Side in 1920.
The Man Who Planted Trees (1987)
A Month in the Country (1987): Set in rural Yorkshire during the summer of 1920, the film follows a destitute World War I veteran employed to carry out restoration work on a Medieval mural discovered in a rural church while coming to terms with the after-effects of the war.
Life and Nothing But (1989): Set in October 1920, it tells the story of Major Delaplane, a man whose job is to find the identities of unknown dead soldiers after World War I.
The Treaty (1991): The film is about the Anglo-Irish Treaty that Michael Collins bargained for with the British government in 1921.
Michael Collins (1996)
The Image Makers (2000): The drama is set in the year 1920 at Filmstaden where the film director Victor Sjöström is shooting the film The Phantom Carriage.
The Admiral (2008)
1920 film series (2008–2016)
1920 (2008)
1920: The Evil Returns (2012)
1920: London (2016)
Battle of Warsaw 1920 (2011)
Sunstroke (2014)

See also
List of American films of 1920

References

 
Film by year